The Kosovo men's national basketball team represents Kosovo in international basketball. They are controlled by the Basketball Federation of Kosovo, the governing body for basketball in Kosovo. Kosovo has been a member of FIBA since 13 March 2015.

History

Pre-independence
The Basketball Federation of Kosovo was founded in 1991. During the Yugoslavian era, Kosovo had its own Superleague and lower divisions, in both genders. In the 1990s, Kosovo declared political and sports independence from the Yugoslav system, organising its own league, based on different teams from seven major cities of Kosovo. Some basketball players from Kosovo, especially Kosovo Serbs and Gorani, participated as part of the Serbia and Montenegro and Serbia national teams.

After independence
Kosovo were not allowed to play international matches, not even friendlies by FIBA, until 2015, when the Basketball Federation of Kosovo became an official member of FIBA and FIBA Europe. Kosovo took part in EuroBasket qualification for the first time in 2017. On 31 August 2016, Kosovo played their first official international match against Slovenia during the EuroBasket 2017 qualifiers.

A year later, the national team achieved their first ever win on 2 August 2017 by defeating Macedonia 72–68 in their first match during the 2019 FIBA World Cup European Pre-Qualifiers. After the win, Kosovo would pick up one more victory during the Pre-Qualifiers, against Estonia 75–69 to finish with a (2–2) record to advance to the first round of World Cup qualifying. In the next round, Kosovo would eventually see their World Cup hopes vanish, as the team went winless before being eliminated. Despite all of that they maintain to reach the second qualifying round in their debut participation, reaching the round of 32 best Basketball teams in Europe.

After missing out on reaching the 2019 FIBA World Cup, Kosovo went through pre-qualifiers in order to reach EuroBasket 2022. However, the team would only compile a (2–8) record during the pre-qualifying process to be unable to advance.

Competitive record

FIBA World Cup

Olympic Games

EuroBasket

Results and fixtures

2021

2022

Team

Current roster
The following is the Kosovo roster called up for the EuroBasket 2025 pre-qualifiers first round match against , on 30 June 2022.

Depth chart

Head coach history
 Arben Krasniqi – (2011–2017)
 Brad Greenberg – (2017–2018)
 Damir Mulaomerović – (2018–2019)
 Christos Marmarinos – (2020–present)

Retired numbers

See also

Sport in Kosovo
Kosovo men's national under-20 basketball team
Kosovo men's national under-18 basketball team
Kosovo men's national under-16 basketball team

References

External links
Official website 
Kosovo at FIBA site
Kosovo National Team – Men at Eurobasket.com

Basketball
Men's national basketball teams
Senior